Ernest Forrest (19 February 1919 – January 1987) was an English footballer who played as a right-half in the Football League.

During World War II, Forrest enlisted in the 53rd (Bolton) Field Regiment, Royal Artillery, along with many of his teammates.

References

External links

Ernie Forrest at Spartacus Educational

1919 births
1987 deaths
Footballers from Sunderland
British Army personnel of World War II
English footballers
Association football wing halves
Darwen F.C. players
Bolton Wanderers F.C. players
Grimsby Town F.C. players
Millwall F.C. players
English Football League players
Royal Artillery personnel
Military personnel from County Durham